Sphenophryne coggeri is a species of frog in the family Microhylidae. It is endemic to New Guinea and known from two regions in Papua New Guinea, one in the Madang Province and the other in the Southern Highlands Province (the intervening areas have seen little survey work). The specific name coggeri honors Harold Cogger, a herpetologist from the Australian Museum.

Description
Adult males measure  and females  in snout–vent length. The head is slightly narrower than the body. The eyes are relatively large. The tympanum is indistinct. The fingertips are flattened but not disc-like; the toe tips are disc-like. There is no webbing between the fingers or the toes.

The male advertisement call is a single-note call, consisting of several notes uttered in rapid succession.

Habitat and conservation
Its natural habitats are montane forests and it has been found under logs and in leaf litter. There is no information about threats to this little known species.

References

coggeri
Amphibians of New Guinea
Amphibians of Papua New Guinea
Endemic fauna of New Guinea
Endemic fauna of Papua New Guinea
Taxa named by Richard G. Zweifel
Amphibians described in 2000
Taxonomy articles created by Polbot